Tarka the Otter is a 1979 British adventure film directed by David Cobham. It is based on the 1927 novel of the same name by Henry Williamson. Tarka the Otter was voted 98th in Channel 4’s poll of the 100 Greatest Family Films.

Production
The role of Tarka was played by an otter called Spade.

Musical score
The music score used in the film, composed by David Fanshawe, was released on a soundtrack album on the Argo label in 1979 (ZSW 613), and included Peter Ustinov's narration.

In 1976 Anthony Phillips, formerly a guitarist with Genesis, and Harry Williamson had recorded a soundtrack to the film  with the support of David Cobham, the producer. Harry had helped to persuade his father to sign the contract, reassuring him that with the music he had composed, the film would be true to the book. However, the orchestral work was not used. In 1987, Amy International paid for the completion of the work at Strawberry Studios and it was released by PRT records as simply Tarka. In 2001 the work was re-released with additional music by Voiceprint Records. The music was commissioned for its first live performance with a symphony orchestra in Melbourne in February 2010.

References

External links

1979 films
1970s children's adventure films
British children's adventure films
Films based on British novels
Films about otters
1970s English-language films
1970s British films